This is a list of Nigerian films released in 2009.

Films

See also
 List of Nigerian films

References

External links
 2009 films at the Internet Movie Database

2009
Lists of 2009 films by country or language
Films